Along Came Jones is the 1965 debut album recorded by Tom Jones and included his massive hit single "It's Not Unusual". The album reached No 11.  Some of the songs were covers and some were written especially for Jones like the Gordon Mills-penned "The Rose".

In June 1965, Parrot Records (USA, Canada) issued an abridged (12-track) version of the album titled It's Not Unusual.

UK Track listing 
Side 1
 "I've Got a Heart" (Gordon Mills, Les Reed) 2:33
 "It Takes a Worried Man" (Traditional; arranged by Gordon Mills) 2:40
 "Skye Boat Song" (Traditional; arranged by Malcolm Lawson and Harold Boulton) 2:59
 "Once Upon a Time" (Gordon Mills) 2:07
 "Memphis, Tennessee" (Chuck Berry) 2:40
 "Whatcha' Gonna Do" (Chuck Willis) 3:07
 "I Need Your Loving" (Don Gardner, Bobby Robinson, Clarence Lewis, James McDougall) 2:38
 "It's Not Unusual" (Gordon Mills, Les Reed) 1:58
Side 2
 "Autumn Leaves" (Joseph Kosma, Johnny Mercer, Geoffrey Parsons, Jacques Prévert) 3:08
 "The Rose - Version 2" (Gordon Mills) 2:53
 "If You Need Me" (Wilson Pickett, Robert Bateman, Sonny Sanders) 2:38
 "Some Other Guy" (Gordon Mills) 2:31
 "Endlessly" (Brook Benton, Clyde Otis) 3:19
 "It's Just a Matter of Time" (Clyde Otis, Brook Benton, Belford Hendricks) 2:42
 "Spanish Harlem" (Jerry Leiber, Phil Spector) 3:18
 "When the World was Beautiful" (Paul Kaufman, Jerry Harris) 2:16

US Track Listing 
Side 1
 "It's Not Unusual" (Mills, Reed) 1:58
 "Memphis, Tennessee" (Berry) 2:40
 "I Need Your Loving" (Gardner) 2:38
 "Whatcha Gonna Do" (Willis) 3:07
 "Skye Boat Song" (Traditional) 2:59
 "Worried Man" (Traditional) 2:40
Side 2
 "Once Upon a Time" (Mills) 2:07
 "Autumn Leaves" (Kosma, Mercer, Parsons, Prévert) 3:08
 "It's Just a Matter of Time" (Otis, Benton, Hendricks) 2:42
 "Spanish Harlem" (Leiber, Spector) 3:18
 "If You Need Me" (Pickett, Bateman, Sanders) 2:38
 "When the World Was Beautiful" (Kaufman, Harris) 2:16

Personnel
 Peter Sullivan - producer
 Les Reed - musical director
 Bill Price - engineer
 John Beale - cover photography

References

External links
 

Tom Jones (singer) albums
1965 debut albums
Decca Records albums
Albums produced by Peter Sullivan (record producer)